The 2016 Southeastern Conference football season was the 84th season of SEC football and took place during the 2016 NCAA Division I FBS football season. The season began on September 1 with Tennessee defeating Appalachian State on the SEC Network. This is the fifth season for the SEC under realignment that took place in 2012 adding Texas A&M and Missouri from the Big 12 Conference. The SEC is a Power Five conference under the College Football Playoff format along with the Atlantic Coast Conference, the Big 12 Conference, the Big Ten Conference, and the Pac-12 Conference.

The SEC consists of 14 members: Alabama, Arkansas, Auburn, Florida, Georgia, Kentucky, LSU, Mississippi, Mississippi State, Missouri, South Carolina, Tennessee, Texas A&M, and Vanderbilt; and is split up into the Western and Eastern divisions, with the champion of each division meeting in Atlanta to compete for the SEC Championship on December 3.
Alabama enters the season as defending SEC champions as they defeated Florida in the previous year's championship game. The Tide would then go on to defeat the Washington Huskies in the Peach Bowl, but lost to Clemson 35-31 on January 9, 2017 in the National Championship Game.

Preseason

Recruiting classes

SEC Media Days
The SEC conducted its annual media days at the Hyatt Regency Birmingham – The Wynfrey Hotel in Hoover, Alabama between July 11 and July 14. The event commenced with a speech by commissioner Greg Sankey, and all 14 teams sent their head coaches and three selected players to speak with members of the media. The event along with all speakers and interviews were broadcast live on the SEC Network and streamed live on ESPN.com. On Monday, the teams and representatives in respective order were as follows: Auburn (Gus Malzahn, Carl Lawson, Montravius Adams, Marcus Davis), Florida (Jim McElwain, David Sharpe, Jarrad Davis, Marcus Maye), and Vanderbilt (Derek Mason, Ralph Webb, Zach Cunningham, Oren Burks). On Tuesday: Georgia (Kirby Smart, Jeb Blazevich, Brandon Kublanow, Dominick Sanders), Mississippi State (Dan Mullen, Richie Brown, Fred Ross, A.J. Jefferson), Tennessee (Butch Jones, Joshua Dobbs, Jalen Reeves-Maybin, Cameron Sutton), and Texas A&M (Kevin Sumlin, Myles Garrett, Trevor Knight, Ricky Seals-Jones). On Wednesday: Alabama (Nick Saban, Jonathan Allen, O.J. Howard, Eddie Jackson), Arkansas (Bret Bielema, Brooks Ellis, Deatrich Wise Jr., Jeremy Sprinkle), Kentucky (Mark Stoops, Jojo Kemp, Courtney Love, Jon Toth), and Missouri (Barry Odom, Sean Culkin, Charles Harris, Michael Scherer). On Thursday: South Carolina (Will Muschamp, Deebo Samuel, Marquavius Lewis, Mason Zandi), Ole Miss (Hugh Freeze, Chad Kelly, Evan Engram, D.J. Jones), and LSU (Les Miles, Leonard Fournette, Ethan Pocic, Tre'Davious White).

Media Polls
The SEC Media Days concluded with its annual preseason media polls. Since 1992, the credentialed media has gotten the preseason champion correct just five times. Only eight times has the preseason pick even made it to the SEC title game. Below are the results of the media poll with total points received next to each school and first-place votes in parentheses.

SEC Champion Voting
 Alabama – 223
 LSU – 59
 Tennessee – 29
 Georgia – 7
 Florida – 5
 Ole Miss – 4
 Texas A&M – 1
 South Carolina – 1
 Arkansas – 1
 Vanderbilt – 1

West Division
 1. Alabama – 2,220 (246)
 2. LSU – 1,984 (76)
 3. Ole Miss – 1,479 (5)
 4. Texas A&M – 1,130 (3)
 5. Arkansas – 1,047 (1)
 6. Auburn – 890
 7. Mississippi State – 518

East Division
 1. Tennessee – 2,167 (225)
 2. Florida – 1,891 (57)
 3. Georgia – 1,860 (45)
 4. Kentucky – 933
 5. Vanderbilt – 810 (2)
 6. Missouri – 807
 7. South Carolina – 800 (2)

References:

Preseason All-SEC: Media

(*) Indicates tie

References:

Head coaches

Three SEC teams hired new head coaches for the 2016 season. All three were in the Eastern Division, and all three were replacing coaches who had spent at least 11 seasons at their respective schools. Former Alabama defensive coordinator Kirby Smart was hired to replace long-time coach Mark Richt at Georgia, who left for the same position at Miami. Missouri promoted defensive coordinator Barry Odom to head coach to replace long-time coach Gary Pinkel who resigned at the end of the season. Former Florida head coach Will Muschamp was hired to replace long-time head coach Steve Spurrier at South Carolina, who resigned halfway through the season. Muschamp had spent the previous season as defensive coordinator at Auburn.

After losing to Auburn in dramatic fashion and falling to 2–2 for the first time since 2001, LSU fired head coach Les Miles and offensive coordinator Cam Cameron on September 25, 2016. During his 11+ seasons as head coach, Miles led the Tigers through one of the most successful periods in school history during which they averaged nearly 10 wins per season, won the 2008 BCS Championship and appeared in the 2011 Championship Game, won 2 SEC titles, appeared in the post-season each year with 7 bowl victories, signed 9 top 10 recruiting classes, and had 69 players drafted by the NFL. Defensive line coach Ed Orgeron was named interim head coach for the remainder of the season, and on November 26 after compiling a 5–2 record, Orgeron was named permanent head coach.

Note: All stats shown are before the beginning of the season.

References:

Rankings

Regular season

All times Eastern time.  SEC teams in bold.

Rankings reflect those of the AP poll for that week until week 10 when CFP rankings are used.

Week One

Players of the week:

Week Two

Players of the week:

Week Three

Players of the week:

Week Four

Players of the week:

Week Five

Players of the week:

Week Six

The game between Georgia and South Carolina was rescheduled due to Hurricane Matthew; game originally scheduled for October 8 at 7:30 p.m. on the SEC Network.

Players of the week:

Week Seven

Players of the week:

Week Eight

Players of the week:

Week Nine

Players of the week:

Week Ten

Players of the week:

Week Eleven

Players of the week:

Week Twelve

The game between LSU and Florida was rescheduled from October 8 and moved from Ben Hill Griffin Stadium to Tiger Stadium due to Hurricane Matthew. The two school's athletic departments agreed to buy out their respective Week 12 non-conference opponents (South Alabama, and Presbyterian) to schedule this game. As a result of playing the game in Baton Rouge, the two schools agreed to play the next two games of the series in Gainesville.

Players of the week:

Week Thirteen

Players of the week:

SEC Championship Game

References:

SEC vs other Conferences

SEC vs Power Conference matchups

This is a list of the power conference teams (ACC, Big Ten, Big 12, Pac-12) the SEC plays in non-conference (Rankings from the AP Poll):

 The SEC recognizes independents Army, BYU and Notre Dame as power five teams for scheduling purposes.

Records against non-conference opponents

Regular Season

Post Season

Bowl games

(Rankings from final CFP Poll; All times Eastern)

Awards and honors

SEC Football Awards
Offensive Player of the Year: Jalen Hurts, Alabama
Defensive Player of the Year: Jonathan Allen, Alabama
Special Teams Player of the Year: Daniel Carlson, Auburn
Freshman Player of the Year: Jalen Hurts, Alabama
Scholar–Athlete of the Year: Brooks Ellis, Arkansas
Jacobs Blocking Trophy: Cam Robinson, Alabama
Coach of the Year: Nick Saban, Alabama

Reference:

All-SEC Teams

Coaches were not permitted to vote for their own players.

Reference:

(*) Indicates tie

National Award Finalists

Winners in bold
 Walter Camp Award (player of the year) – Jonathan Allen, Alabama
 Bednarik Award (best defensive player) – Jonathan Allen, Alabama; Myles Garrett, Texas A&M
 Bronko Nagurski Award (best defensive player) – Jonathan Allen, Alabama; Reuben Foster, Alabama
 Manning Award (quarterback) – Jalen Hurts, Alabama
 Butkus Award (best linebacker) – Kendell Beckwith, LSU; Zach Cunningham, Vanderbilt; Jarrad Davis, Florida; Reuben Foster, Alabama
 Jim Thorpe Award (best defensive back) – Tre'Davious White, LSU
 Ted Hendricks Award (best defensive end) – Jonathan Allen, Alabama
 John Mackey Award (best tight end) – O. J. Howard, Alabama
 Outland Trophy (best interior lineman) – Cam Robinson, Alabama
 Dave Rimington Trophy (best center) – Ethan Pocic, LSU
 Lombardi Award (best lineman/linebacker) – Jonathan Allen, Alabama; Myles Garrett, Texas A&M
 Lou Groza Award (best kicker) – Daniel Carlson, Auburn
 Wuerffel Trophy (humanitarian–athlete) – Trevor Knight, Texas A&M
 Campbell Trophy ("academic Heisman") – Brooks Ellis, Arkansas
 Mortell Award (best holder) – Connor McQueen, Texas A&M

Reference:

All-Americans

HB –
HB –
TE –
OL –
OL –
DL –
DL –
DL –
LB –
LB –
DB –
DB –
DB –
P –
AP –
AP –
AP –

References:

Home game attendance

Game played at Arkansas' secondary home stadium War Memorial Stadium, capacity: 54,120.

Attendance for neutral site games:

 September 3 – Alabama vs. USC, AT&T Stadium: 81,359
 September 3 – Georgia vs. North Carolina, Georgia Dome: 75,405
 September 3 – LSU vs. Wisconsin, Lambeau Field: 77,823
 September 3 – Ole Miss vs. Florida State, Camping World Stadium: 63,042
 September 10 – Tennessee vs. Virginia Tech, Bristol Motor Speedway: 156,990
 September 24 – Arkansas vs. Texas A&M, AT&T Stadium: 67,751
 October 29 – Florida vs. Georgia, EverBank Field: 84,681

 – Current NCAA record for largest attendance to a collegiate football game.

Reference:

References